Noiselets are functions which gives the worst case behavior for the Haar wavelet packet analysis. In other words, noiselets are totally incompressible by the Haar wavelet packet analysis. Like the canonical and Fourier bases, which have an incoherent property, noiselets are perfectly incoherent with the Haar basis. In addition, they have a fast algorithm for implementation, making them useful as a sampling basis for signals that are sparse in the Haar domain.

Definition 
The mother bases function  is defined as:

The family of noislets is constructed recursively as follows:

Property of fn 

 For  each ,

Matrix construction of noiselets 
Noiselet can be extended and discretized. The extended function  is defined as follows:

Use extended noiselet , we can generate the  noiselet matrix , where n is a power of two :

Here  denotes the Kronecker product.

Suppose , we can find that  is equal .

The elements of the noiselet matrices take discrete values from one of two four-element sets:

2D noiselet transform 
2D noiselet transforms are obtained through the Kronecker product of 1D noiselet transform:

Applications

Noiselet has some properties that make them ideal for applications:

 Noiselet completely spread out spectrum and have the perfectly incoherent with Haar wavelets.
 Noiselet is conjugate symmetric and is unitary.

The complementarity of wavelets and noiselets means that noiselets can be used in compressed sensing to reconstruct a signal (such as an image) which has a compact representation in wavelets. MRI data can be acquired in noiselet domain, and, subsequently, images can be reconstructed from undersampled data using compressive-sensing reconstruction.

References

Signal processing